Ramón Luis Rivera Cruz (born February 3, 1956) is a Puerto Rican politician affiliated with the New Progressive Party. He is the current Mayor of Bayamón, and succeeded his father, Ramón Luis Rivera, when the latter decided to retire after 23 years in office (1977–2000). Rivera served as a member of the Senate of Puerto Rico for the District of Bayamón from 1993 to 2000. He has been mayor of Bayamón since then.

Early life 
Ramón Luis Rivera Cruz was born on February 3, 1956. He is the first born of 5 siblings, son to Ramón Luis Rivera and Angélica Cruz. Luis Rivera Jr. attended Colegio Santo Domingo and Escuela Papa Juan XXIII for elementary and secondary school, respectively. Later he continued higher studies in Colegio Universitario Tecnológico de Bayamón de la Universidad de Puerto Rico and American University of Puerto Rico, where he gained a Bachelor of Business Administration. In 1994 Luis River Jr. married Narel Waleska Colón and had two sons: Ramon Luis III and André Efraín.

Political career
In 1980, he started his political career as campaign manager for his father, Ramón Luis Rivera, the then-mayor of Bayamon seeking reelection. He was elected as a senator of the Bayamón district in 1992 and was reelected again in 1996.

During his time in the Senate, he was a chairman of different committees. Between them, Committee of Urbanism and Infrastructure, Committee on Ethics, Committee on Youth and the Committee of Recreation and Sports.

In 2000, he aspired for the mayorship of Bayamon, the position his father had served since 1977. He won the mayorship and has been reelected four more times.

References 

Living people
1956 births
New Progressive Party (Puerto Rico) politicians
Mayors of Bayamón, Puerto Rico
People from Bayamón, Puerto Rico
University of Puerto Rico alumni